The Whitehorse Formation is a geologic formation in Nebraska and Oklahoma. It preserves fossils dating back to the Permian period.

See also

 List of fossiliferous stratigraphic units in Nebraska
 Paleontology in Nebraska

References

 

Permian geology of Oklahoma
Permian geology of Texas